The Aniak River (Yup'ik: Anyaraq) is a  tributary of the Kuskokwim River in the U.S. state of Alaska. Beginning south of Aniak Lake, the river generally flows north. The upper sections drain part of the Kilbuck and Kuskokwim mountains, and the lower portions transition to the Kuskokwim lowlands and tundra. The river empties into the Kuskokwim River slightly east of Aniak.

Aniak is a Yup'ik word meaning "the place where it comes out," which refers to the mouth of the Aniak River. This river played a role in the Placer Gold Rush of 1900–01, when prospectors from Nome rushed to the Kuskokwim River Delta after hearing of discoveries along the "Yellow River", later believed to be the Aniak River because of the yellow tint from silt carried from headwater streams.

The Aniak has excellent sports fishing opportunities for salmon, Arctic char, rainbow trout, Arctic grayling, and, near the river mouth in spring, northern pike and sheefish. In addition, Aniak Lake supports populations of lake trout. Several sports fishing outfitters operate along the Aniak.

Navigation of the river is tricky, since it is swift flowing with multiple channels and many hazards, including debris loads, log jams and sweepers (trees hanging just above the water which "sweep" the surface as it flows by) that change position with each spring's ice breakup cycle. The lower river is more navigable with an experienced boat driver. Historical winter trails parallel most of its length.

See also
 List of rivers of Alaska

References

External links
 

Rivers of Bethel Census Area, Alaska
Rivers of Dillingham Census Area, Alaska
Rivers of Alaska
Rivers of Unorganized Borough, Alaska